Chantal Schertz (born 18 July 1958) is a retired French swimmer who won a bronze medal in the 4 × 100 m freestyle relay at the 1974 European Aquatics Championships. She competed in the same event at the 1972 and 1976 Summer Olympics and finished sixth in 1976.

References

1958 births
Living people
Swimmers at the 1972 Summer Olympics
Swimmers at the 1976 Summer Olympics
Olympic swimmers of France
European Aquatics Championships medalists in swimming
French female freestyle swimmers